Gymnoscelis conjurata is a moth in the family Geometridae. It is found on Sri Lanka.

References

Moths described in 1958
Gymnoscelis